Marion Verbruggen (born 1950) is a Dutch recorder player and teacher.

Verbruggen was born in Amsterdam and studied with Kees Otten at the Amsterdam Conservatory. She then studied at the Royal Conservatory of The Hague with Frans Brüggen.  Upon completing her diplomas cum laude, she was invited to join the faculty at the Royal Conservatory. She now guest teaches there and gives master-classes and workshops throughout the world.

Marion Verbruggen is one of the world's leading soloists on the recorder. Her discography ranges from 17th-century Spanish songs and theatre music to her own transcriptions of the cello suites by J.S. Bach. She is an ardent advocate of contemporary music.

Verbruggen made her conducting debut recently with the Portland Baroque Orchestra in Portland, Oregon.

References

External links
 Short biography on the Bach Cantatas Website accessed May 25, 2015.
 Brief bio and discography of Marion Verbruggen on the Harmonia Mundi site

1950 births
Living people
Dutch recorder players
Dutch flautists
Dutch performers of early music
Women performers of early music
Musicians from Amsterdam
Royal Conservatory of The Hague alumni
Women flautists